Herbert Henry Bullmore MB ChB Edin MRCPE FRACP (12 July 1874 – 28 December 1937) was a rugby union player who represented Scotland, a leading physician and the grandfather of Australian media magnate Kerry Packer.

Life history
Bullmore was born in Ipswich, Queensland in 1874, the only son, along with five daughters, of grazier and unsuccessful political candidate Edward Augustus Bullmore, Esq and Caroline Frederica Bullmore, and was educated at Ipswich Grammar School, Queensland. While in Australia, Bullmore made a name for himself as a sportsman, going as far as being chosen to represent Queensland at rugby union. Bullmore spent three years studying law, before deciding to undertake medical studies at the University of Edinburgh in Scotland, graduating in 1902. During this time Bullmore continued to indulge his sporting nature, gaining a blue in football and rowing and starring as a sturdy second-rower for the university rugby union team. From 1901 to 1902 Bullmore was President of Edinburgh University Union. By dint of his medical degree at Edinburgh, Bullmore was available for selection to the Scotland rugby teams and was selected to represent Scotland as a forward in a match against Ireland in Belfast on 22 February 1902, with Scotland losing 5–0.

Bullmore served as a resident at the Royal Infirmary and at the Children's Hospital, Edinburgh, gaining his Membership of the Royal College of Physicians of Edinburgh in 1904. He then practised in Bath for a while before returning to Australia to practice as a consulting physician in Sydney.

Appointed an honorary physician at St Vincent's Hospital, Sydney, in 1912, Bullmore treated leading Australian cricketer Victor Trumper during Trumper's final days suffering from Bright's disease. Bullmore would later also be appointed honorary physician at the Prince of Wales Hospital, Sydney, in 193, was an honorary major in the Australian Army Medical Corps and one of the founders of the Royal Australasian College of Physicians.

While Bullmore retired from rugby, soccer and rowing to concentrate on his medical career, he continued to be involved in sporting interests, including motor cycling, tennis, golf and angling.

Bullmore died suddenly at his residence "Altona" in Point Piper, Sydney on 28 December 1937. His funeral was held at All Saints Church, Woollahra and was cremated. His estate was worth £9,944.

Personal life
Bullmore married Melbourne-born Elfrida Buttner, the daughter of Dr Alexander Buttner, at St Andrew's Church, Ashley-place, London on 24 August 1904 and together they had a son and four daughters. Bullmore's son Herbert James Bullmore was a Flyer-Officer in the Royal Australian Air Force who was killed in action in New Guinea during World War II, while one of Bullmore's daughters was Mary Horden, fashion editor of The Australian Women's Weekly from 1946 to 1957 and another was Gretel Packer, the wife of Sir Frank Packer and the mother of Australian media magnate Kerry Packer.

References

1874 births
1937 deaths
Alumni of the University of Edinburgh
Australian medical doctors
Australian rugby union players
Edinburgh University RFC players
Rugby union forwards
Rugby union players from Maitland, New South Wales
Scotland international rugby union players